This is a list of church murals in Sweden which are also referred to as ceiling paintings, wall paintings or sometimes church frescos. In Swedish, they are usually called kalkmålningar (lime paintings) takmålningar (ceiling paintings) or väggmålningar (wall paintings).

The list is far from complete. Please feel free to add to it, either with new entries or additional details in regard to the existing entries.

The list

References

External links

Medeltidens bildvärld [The world of images of the Middle Ages], a database with searchable photos of i.a. church murals, run by the Swedish History Museum (in Swedish)

church frescos